Peter Arnold Billingham (1938-2019) was a greyhound trainer and an English professional footballer.

Football career
Billingham was associated with Worcester City F.C., Brierley Hill Alliance F.C. and Hednesford Town F.C. before making his professional debut for Walsall during October 1955 and played 99 times for the club. He was transferred to West Bromwich Albion for £7,000 in May 1960.

Greyhound racing career
After retiring from football Billingham pursued a career in greyhound racing. He became a trainer and had a career that lasted over forty years until he retired in 2008 and handed the kennels to his daughter Kim. He trained out of the Swindon near Dudley kennels and was contracted at Kings Heath, Cradley, Norton Canes and a long association with Monmore Green Stadium.

Some of his highlights included reaching the 2007 Oaks final and training Honeygar Bell, who broke the Oxford Stadium track record and receiving a lifetime achievement award in 2008, at the Midland Greyhound Ball at the NEC Hilton Metropole, Birmingham.

References 

1938 births
2019 deaths
British greyhound racing trainers
English footballers
West Bromwich Albion F.C. players
Walsall F.C. players
Worcester City F.C. players
Brierley Hill Alliance F.C. players
Hednesford Town F.C. players
Association football wing halves
Sportspeople from the West Midlands (county)